Amaragol is a village in Dharwad district of Karnataka, India.

Demographics
As of the 2011 Census of India there were 557 households in Amaragol and a total population of 2,933 consisting of 1,487 males and 1,446 females. There were 410 children ages 0-6.

References

Villages in Dharwad district